Longiflagrum amphibium is an estuarine species of crustacean in the order Tanaidacea. It is known only from the type locality, which is the intertidal zone at Port Hedland, Northwestern Australia.

Description
Longiflagrum amphibium can be distinguished from the other four species of the genus Longiflagrum by having the shortest flagellum in the antennule and by its oval pleopod basis. The specific name  is from the Latin for "amphibious". The name reflects the species' presence in the intertidal zone.

Ecology
All five Longiflagrum species occur in shallow coastal habitats such as the intertidal zone, eelgrass beds and estuaries where the salinity fluctuates over the range 5–34 psu, and they are a frequent and abundant element of the soft-bottom ecosystem.

References

External links

Tanaidacea
Crustaceans of Australia
Crustaceans described in 2009